9200 may refer to:

 A.D. 9200, a year in the 10th millennium CE
 9200 BCE, a year in the 10th millennium BC
 9200, a number in the 9000 (number) range
 9200 (1993 FK21), an asteroid in the Asteroid Belt, the 9200th asteroid registered; see List_of_minor_planets:_9001–10000
 Telephone area code 9200; see telephone numbers in Saudi Arabia
 ATI Radeon 9200, a computer graphics card series
 Chiba New Town Railway 9200 series, an electrical multiple unit train set series
 Microsoft Windows Build 9200, the reported build number of the RTM build of Windows 8
 Mossberg 9200, a 12-gauge semi-automatic shotgun
 UNIVAC 9200, a mainframe computer

See also